The former Singapore National Stadium was a multi-purpose stadium in Kallang, which opened in July 1973 and closed on 30 June 2007. The stadium was demolished from 2010 to 2011 for the development of the Singapore Sports Hub, which houses its successor. During its closure from 2007 to 2014, the National Day Parade (NDP) and sports events were held at the Marina Bay Floating Platform and Jalan Besar Stadium.

The stadium was prominently the home of Singapore FA, a club side, and the Singapore national team. It also hosted the Singapore Cup finals annually, the first in 1996, and the second leg of the 2004 AFF Championship finals.

In addition to association football matches, the stadium hosted the 1973, 1983 and 1993 Southeast Asian Games, the Singapore Armed Forces day parades and the opening ceremony of the biennial Singapore Youth Festival, as well as numerous music and cultural events. It was the primary venue for the NDP.

History

Conceptualisation 

Soon after the end of the Second World War, as Singapore moved towards self-government and independence, the clamour began for a national stadium.

Funding 
A state-owned lottery company, Singapore Pools, was set up in 1968 to raise funds for the stadium. Proceeds from the Singapore Sweep and TOTO were used to pay a substantial part of the construction bill. Between 1968 and 1976, the company contributed S$14.5 million towards the project. Singapore Pools also helped the stadium repay a government loan of $7.8 million meant as start-up money for a stadium management corporation. Following the completion of the National Stadium, Singapore Pools remained a major sponsor of stadium, as well as the National Day Parade.

Construction 
On 7 December 1966, in the year that Singapore celebrated its first National Day, Othman drove the first pile into the ground. For the next three and a half years, piling was done to lay the foundations. Work had to be delayed due to bad weather for about a month. By the end of 1970, the stadium was three-quarters completed and was starting to take its definitive shape. By the end of June 1973 when the stadium was completed, 300,000 bags of cement, 3,000,000 bricks and 4,500 tons of steel and timber had been used. The new stadium was opened to the public for the first time on 19 July 1973.

Redevelopment 
Plans were made to demolish the stadium and build a multipurpose,  Singapore Sports Hub in its place. Demolition works began in the second half of 2007, and the new Sports Hub was eventually completed in 2014. Three finalist consortia submitted redevelopment plans.

The 2007 ASEAN Football Championship was the last major event held at the National Stadium before its redevelopment.

Closure 
On 30 June 2007, a closing ceremony titled Field of Dreams – A Tribute to the National Stadium was held at the stadium. 45,000 people attended the event, together with President S R Nathan, members of the Cabinet and Singapore athletes, past and present. Before the ceremony, a football match featuring ex-internationals from Singapore and Malaysia like Quah Kim Song, Terry Pathmanathan, Samat Allapitchay, V. Sundramoorthy, David Lee, Dollah Kassim, Soh Chin Aun, Santokh Singh, Chow Siew Wai and K. Gunalan was played.

The match was followed by the highlight of the evening, an international friendly between ASEAN champions Singapore and the Asian Cup bound Australian team, the Socceroos. The Australians won 3–0 with goals scored by English Premier League players Mark Viduka (50, 86 mins) and Harry Kewell (75 min).

This was not the last football match to be played in the stadium as it was subsequently used for 11 football matches. The very last goal scored at the stadium was scored by Gholamreza Rezaei of Iran in a 1–3 loss for the hosts against the Iranian national team in an Asian Cup qualifying match on 6 January 2010.

Demolition
On 29 September 2010: The former National Stadium started its demolition to make way for the construction of the Sports Hub. It was completely torn down in February 2011.

Post-closure 
In February 2013, uniquely designed benches made from the wooden planks from the former National Stadium were presented to the public, as a meaningful way to commemorate this historic landmark. These designs were part of the bench project  organized by local creative practice FARM, and jointly presented by Urban Redevelopment Authority (URA) and the Singapore Furniture Industries Council. Five of the designs were winning entries of the design competition which invited the public to submit designs for benches using the seating planks from the former National Stadium. The rest of the designs were specially created by commissioned local designers from various design fields.

The benches can now be found in various public spaces such as Singapore River, Marina Bay, Gillman Barracks, Esplanade, Gardens by the Bay and the URA Centre.

Facilities 
The National Stadium had an eight-lane running track and football field in addition to other miscellaneous facilities such as table tennis tables, a weights room and an auditorium, housed underneath the spectator stands.

While the facilities were often used for high-profile sporting events, they could also be used by members of the public and other local organizations for a nominal fee. For example, when not otherwise used, the running track could be used by joggers for S$0.50 per entry.

The headquarters of the Singapore Sports Council used to be located at 15 Stadium Road.

New National Stadium

The new National Stadium was officially opened on 30 June 2014 on the site of the Former National Stadium.

Timeline 
The stadium's 44-year history is as follows:
1966
December: Work begins on the S$50 million complex.
1971
4 June: Then-president Benjamin Sheares visits stadium before completion.
1973
17 June: First event at the stadium – an international hockey friendly between Singapore and Australia. Australia wins 3–0.
24 June: First football match – Sultan's Gold Cup final between Singapore Malays and Kelantan Malays. Singapore wins 4–1 in front of a 32,000-strong crowd.
21 July: Official opening by then Prime Minister Lee Kuan Yew.
1–8 September: Hosts the 7th Southeast Asian Peninsular Games. Singapore wins 45 golds, 50 silvers and 45 bronzes. Singapore football team reach semi-finals before losing 3–5 on penalties to South Vietnam, after a 1–1 draw in extra-time.
17 September: Practice track and tennis courts are open to public.
24 October: Boxing great Muhammad Ali fights in a five-round exhibition bout.
1976
28 January: Former Philippines first lady, Imelda Marcos, visits in a Rolls-Royce.
9 August: Stadium hosts first Singapore National Day Parade (NDP).
1977
13 May: Tragedy at stadium, as a mass stampede occurs at the ticketing booths before the Malaysia Cup final between Singapore and Selangor. One man dies as he suffers a fatal heart attack, and 44 are injured.
13 July: Scottish football giants Celtic beat Singapore 5–0 in Metro Quadrangular.
1983
28 May-6 June: Singapore hosts the Southeast Asian Games, winning 38 golds, 38 silvers and 58 bronzes. Football team, led by Fandi Ahmad and V. Sundramoorthy, reach their first final but are beaten 1-2 by Thailand.
Friday, 2 December: David Bowie performs with his band, Carlos Alomar, Carmine Rojas, Tony Thompson, Earl Slick, Frank Simms, George Simms, Lenny Pickett, Stan Harrison, Steve Elson, and David Lebolt in The Serious Moonlight Tour. 
1986
26 July: Rock star David Bowie performs.
20 November: Pope John Paul II makes first visit to Singapore, and conducts a mass.
1988
18 May: Pop star Stevie Wonder performs.
1990
30 March: Arsenal beat South Korea 2–1 in the Caltex Cup, a match to commemorate Singapore's 25th year of independence.
1993
18 March: Singapore beat J-League club Nagoya Grampus Eight 4–3 in a friendly.
12–20 June: Singapore hosts Southeast Asian Games, winning 50 golds, 40 silvers and 74 bronzes. The football team however lose 4–5 to Myanmar in semi-finals on penalties. They lead a comfortable scoreline of 2-0 before Lim Tong Hai scores two own goals.
29 August and 1 September: Entertainer Michael Jackson performed 2 concerts there during his Dangerous World Tour in front of 94.000 of attendance.
2 October: American rock legends Bon Jovi perform at the stadium on their I'll Sleep When I'm Dead Tour.
1995
8 May: American rock legends Bon Jovi perform at the stadium on their These Days Tour.
20 May: English football club Nottingham Forest beat Singapore 3–1 in a friendly.
26 May: Singapore beat English football club Tottenham 4–2 on penalties in a friendly, drawing 1–1 at full-time.
1996
1 April: Then-Prime Minister Goh Chok Tong is guest-of-honour at S-League's opening ceremony.
1 August: English football club Newcastle United beat S-League All-Stars 5–0 in a friendly.
25 October : Entertainer Michael Jackson performed there during the HIStory World Tour in front of 35.000 of attendance.
1997
3 September: J-League club Kashima Antlers beat Geylang United FC 2–1 in an Asian Club Championship (predecessor of AFC Champions League.)
1998
4 March: Billy Joel and Elton John perform together.
31 October: Singapore lift first international rugby union trophy, beating Sri Lanka 25–13 in the plate final of the Standard Chartered Asian Rugby Championships.
1999
1 May: Taiwanese diva A*Mei, the first Asian artist to perform at Singapore National Stadium .
2000
13 March: International phenomenon Mariah Carey performs for the first time in Singapore.
2001
1 February: Fire at stadium causes damage to a media room above the grandstand.
16 July: English football club Liverpool beat Singapore 2–0 in a friendly.
24 July: English football club Manchester United thrash Singapore 8–1 in a friendly.
2002
24 July: Fire at National Stadium, the National Day Parade NDP's main stage catches fire because of an electrical fault.
18 December: Singapore are beaten 0-4 by Malaysia in the Tiger Cup. Singapore, who were joint hosts with Indonesia for the group stages, were eventually knocked out of the competition after only managing a 1–1 draw with Thailand on 22 December.
2005
16 January: Singapore clinch Tiger Cup at National Stadium, beating Indonesia 2-1 (5-2 on aggregate), in the second leg of the final.
2006
9 August: Stadium hosts last National Day Parade.
2007
31 January: Singapore beat Thailand 2–1 in the first leg of the Asean Football Championship final. They clinch their third Asean title on 4 February, drawing 1–1 in Bangkok to win 3–2 on aggregate.
30 June: Official closing ceremony, as the stadium was scheduled to be torn down by the end of 2007 to make way for the new Singapore Sports Hub.
9 August: The stadium's temporary facilities at Marina Bay Float stadium opens and the first major event to be held there, was the National Day Parade 2007. It's now to its last NDP held at Marina Bay on 9 August 2014 before moving back to the National Stadium at Kallang in 2016.
2008
26 March: The National Stadium sees the hosting of a World Cup third round qualifying match for the first time, and Singapore beat Lebanon 2–0.
3 April: The Sports Council announces that the stadium would host at least two more football games, due to ongoing delays in securing the paperwork for the Sports Hub construction.
2 June: The stadium hosted the second home game for the World Cup third round qualifying match, but saw the hosts thrashed 3-7 by Uzbekistan.
14 June: The stadium hosted the third home game for the qualifying, but the hosts lost 0–2 to Saudi Arabia.
28 July: With the project for the new Sports Hub delayed, the stadium hosted a friendly against the Brazil Olympic team which saw the samba kings winning 3–0.
21 December: In the Suzuki Cup semi-finals, the renamed Asean Football Championship, one leg of the game against Vietnam was played at the National Stadium, but Singapore lose to ten-man Vietnam to a goal by Nguyễn Quang Hải, and lost 0–1 on aggregate and were eliminated.
2009
27 January: The stadium hosts the first Group E Asian Cup qualifiers match and the Lions beat Jordan 2–1.
26 July: English football club Liverpool makes their second visit to Singapore and the Reds beat the Singapore national team 5–0.
12 August: Singapore held the Chinese national team to a 1–1 draw in a special National Day Challenge but lost 4–3 in the penalty shootout.
4 November: The Singapore national team beat the Indonesian national team 3–1 in a friendly.
14 November: The second Group E qualifier on home soil for the Asian Cup results in a 1-3 reverse to Thailand.
2010
6 January: The third Group E qualifier for the Asian Cup was a 1–3 defeat to Iran.
17 April: Taiwanese pop group May Day's series of 2010 concerts' Singapore leg, initially scheduled to be held at the Padang was rearranged to the National Stadium, due to overwhelming response. This is the first non-football event to be held at the stadium since the official closure.
June: The grass pitch was stripped bare and the grass has been transplanted to other fields under the Sports Council such as the Kallang Practice Track. This was the first sign of the demolition of the stadium after a three-year delay.
29 September: The National Stadium started its demolition and making way for the construction of the Sports Hub.
2011
February: The demolition of the entire stadium completes.
2012
late 2012: It was announced that NDP 2013 would be the last National Day Parade to be held at the Marina Bay Floating Stadium before moving back to Kallang in 2014.
2013
10 June: Acting Minister for Culture, Community and Youth, Mr Lawrence Wong visits the construction site of the new National Stadium before its completion.
26 November: It was announced that the National Day Parade in 2014 will be the official last one at Marina Bay, as the Sports Hub will not make it on time for the parade.
2014
14 February: Sports Hub CEO Philippe Collin Delavaud announced that the Sports Hub will not be fully open by April 2014 as the National Stadium's completion was pushed back to June 2014.
30 June: The new National Stadium was officially opened on the former site of the Former National Stadium.

See also 
Singapore Indoor Stadium
Singapore National Stadium

References

External links 

National Stadium tribute website 
History of the National Stadium

AFC Asian Cup stadiums
Athletics (track and field) venues in Singapore
Defunct rugby union venues
Demolished buildings and structures in Singapore
Defunct football venues in Singapore
Kallang
Singapore
Rugby union stadiums in Singapore
Sports venues completed in 1973
Sports venues demolished in 2011
Sports venues in Singapore
Singapore Premier League venues
1973 establishments in Singapore
2007 disestablishments in Singapore
Southeast Asian Games stadiums
Southeast Asian Games athletics venues
Southeast Asian Games football venues
20th-century architecture in Singapore